The 1959–60 season was the 14th season in FK Partizan's existence. This article shows player statistics and matches that the club played during the 1959–60 season.

Players

Squad information

Friendlies

Competitions

Yugoslav First League

Yugoslav Cup

Mitropa Cup

Statistics

Goalscorers 
This includes all competitive matches.

Score overview

See also
 List of FK Partizan seasons

References

External links
 Official website
 Partizanopedia 1959-60  (in Serbian)

FK Partizan seasons
Partizan